Strepsinoma grisealis is a moth in the family Crambidae. It was described by Rothschild in 1915. It is found in New Guinea.

The wingspan is about 20 mm. The fore- and hindwings are uniform brownish mouse grey.

References

Acentropinae
Moths described in 1915